Veerachai Duangpla (2 May 1987), known by the pen name The Duang, is a Thai cartoonist and illustrator. He is best known for his series The Story Begins With.... The first volume won the 2010 Silver Award at the 4th International MANGA Award. His works have been published by many renown Thai publishers and are popular among Thai youth. The Duang also became famous after collaborating with VRZO production, one of the most  popular YouTube channel in Thailand.

Profile 
Son of Thai comics artist Ruangsak Duangpla, Veerachai Duangpla started drawing comics at the age of 13, influenced by the work of his father, Thai comics like Kai Hua Rau and manga such as Dragon Ball, Shaman King or Flame of Recca. He then decided to choose the manga One Piece as his model, considering the plot more subtle. Trying to break away from manga's influence, he later introduced some elements of Tim Burton's art into his own style. He studied Visual Communication Art and Design in college and continued to explore the Western comics production, borrowing visual and narrative features from Marvel Comics or French cartoonist Nicolas de Crécy to his art. His most famous series The Story Begins With... is a compilation of short stories concerning instructive episodes and social satires of Thailand through the eyes of a Thai boy. Published by Banlue Books, the first volume won the 2010 Silver Award at the 4th International MANGA Award. The Duang, with other Thai cartoonists of his generation such as Puck, Sa-Ard or Note, is a regular contributor to the alternative Thai magazine LET'S Comic founded in 2004.

The Duang and VRZO 
The Duang gained popularity with Thai teenagers through his collaboration with VRZO production, one of the most famous YouTube channel in Thailand. He adapted classical folk tales into animated cartoons which were meant to provide useful lessons to Thai teenagers. These animated cartoons gathered quickly more than a million views.

Works
 Clart Room, 2006, published by Children's Foundation
 The Lesson of a Doll Boy, 2007, published by Children's Foundation
 Shockolate, 2009, published by Cartoonthai Studio (Siam Inter Comic)
 I AM, 2009, published by Cartoonthai Studio (Siam Inter Comic)
 The Story Begins With..., 2009, published by Banlue Books
 Innocent Series 2009, published by LET'S Comic
 The Story Begins With... volume 2, 2010, published by Banlue Books
 Remember The Duang, 2010, published by LET'S Comic
 Around The Duang, 2010, artbook (resized edition) published by LET'S Comic
 My Inspiration, 2011, published by Fullstop Book
 Robot Boy No.03, 2011, published by Banlue Books
 The Story Begins With... volume 3, 2011, published by Banlue Books
 สงสัยมั้ย ธรรมะ, 2011, story by Chaiyapat illustrated by The Duang, published by A Thing Book
 ขอตามเม้นท์ ทุกชาติ ทุกชาติไป, 2012, published by Children's Foundation
 Innocent Side Stories, 2012, published by LET'S Comic
 The Story Begins With... volume 4, 2012, published by Banlue Books
 สงสัยมั้ย ธรรมะ ฉบับ รู้ทันทุกข์, 2012, story by Chaiyapat illustrated by The Duang, published by A Thing Book
 Quote of The Duang, 2013, published by Banlue Books
 My Inspiration II, 2013, published by Fullstop Book
 The Story Begins With... The Duang in Japan volume 5, 2013, published by Banlue Books
 สงสัยมั้ย ธรรมะ พุทธทาส ฉบับ เช่นนั้นเอง, 2013, story by Chaiyapat illustrated by The Duang, published by A Thing Book
 The Story Begins With... volume 6, 2014, published by Banlue Books
 BlackBoy, The Series - First Chapter: Kill’em All, 2014, published by LET'S Comic
 สงสัยมั้ย ธรรมะ ฉบับ ทุกข์ไม่มีจริง, 2014, story by Chaiyapat illustrated by The Duang, published by A Thing Book
 The Story Begins With... volume 7, 2015, published by Banlue Books
 Tomtam's Diary & Super Robot, 2015, published by Banlue Books
 สงสัยมั้ย ธรรมะ ฉบับ ความปกติ, 2015, story by Chaiyapat illustrated by The Duang, published by A Thing Book
 B&W: Black & White, 2016, published by LET'S Comic
 VRZO - 

Awards
 The Story Begins With..., 2010, Silver Award at the 4th International MANGA Award

References 
11.  Se-ed online book shop

12.The Duang Facebook fan page

External links
 International Manga Award website 

Living people
Thai comics artists
Thai cartoonists
1987 births

ja:ウィーラチャイ・ドゥアンプラー
th:วีระชัย ดวงพลา